Bokissa (also Voisa or Abokisa) is a very small island in the South Pacific island nation of Vanuatu located  south of Espiritu Santo.

The island is owned and run as a tourist resort and is promoted as being managed in an environmentally responsible manner.

Population
There were 56 people living on the island according to the 2009 census.

References

External links 
 Bokissa Island Resort web site 

Islands of Vanuatu
Private islands of Oceania
Sanma Province